Missy Stone may refer to:

Missy Stone, American actress nominated for two 2009 AVN Awards
Missy Stone, a supporting character in the American Horror Story: Asylum episode, "Nor'easter"